Marcus Lyon is a British photographer based in London. Examples of his work are held in the National Air and Space Museum of the Smithsonian Institution.

Life and work

Since 2008 he has been chair of the Consortium for Street Children; he has also sat on the board  of the Somerset House Trust and Leader's Quest.

He has made series of photographs entitled Exodus, Timeout and Intersection.

In 2014 Lyon he founded the Human Atlas initiative. In this work his studio creates books and exhibitions that study nominated groups of people in specified geographies through the lens of portraits, app-based image-activated soundscapes and ancestral DNA maps. To date, the team has created projects on Brazil, Germany, and Detroit.

Publications

 Lyon, Marcus (2016). Somos Brasil – A Human Atlas of a Nation: São Paulo, Brazil: Editora Madalena & ImageMagica. ISBN 978-85-61921-06-4.

Exhibitions 

 2017 – Somos Brasil: CBB, São Paulo, Brazil
 2017 – Somos Brasil: Pingyao, China
 2018 – Somos Brasil, Royal Botanical Gardens: Sydney, Australia
 2019 – Embassy of Brazil: London, United Kingdom

Awards 

 2017 – D&AD Yellow Pencil / Book Design / Culture, Art & Design Books Visualisation for ‘Somos Brasil’ book
 2019 – British Book Awards – Best Self-published Book for ‘WE: deutschland’ book
 2021 – Design Week Awards – Editorial Design / Social Design for ‘i.Detroit’ book

References 

21st-century British photographers
Living people
Year of birth missing (living people)